Adam Jakobsen (born 7 April 1999) is a Danish footballer who plays as a forward for FC Fredericia.

References

External links
Adam Jakobsen at the Danish Football Association

1999 births
Living people
Danish men's footballers
Association football forwards
Boldklubben Frem players
Vejle Boldklub players
Kolding IF players
NK Celje players
FC Fredericia players
Danish 2nd Division players
Danish Superliga players
Danish 1st Division players
Slovenian PrvaLiga players
Danish expatriate men's footballers
Expatriate footballers in Slovenia
Denmark youth international footballers